Embsay with Eastby is a civil parish and electoral ward in the Craven district of North Yorkshire, England. Its main settlements are the village of Embsay and the nearby hamlet of Eastby.

According to the 2001 UK census, Embsay with Eastby parish/ward had a population of 1,758, increasing to 1,871 at the 2011 Census.

Embsay Reservoir is within the parish.

References

Civil parishes in North Yorkshire